The northern smooth shore crab, Cyclograpsus insularum, is a marine crab of the family Varunidae, found around Lord Howe Island, Norfolk Island, the Kermadec Islands and in New Zealand from North Cape to East Cape.

References

External links
 SeaFriends

Grapsoidea
Marine crustaceans of New Zealand
Crustaceans described in 1966